Gadolinium iodide may refer to:

 Gadolinium diiodide, GdI2
 Gadolinium(III) iodide (gadolinium triiodide), GdI3